Goljiran (also Romanized as Goljīrān and Gol Jīrān; also known as Gol Jīrān-e Soflá and Goljīrān-e Soflá) is a village in Osmanvand Rural District, Firuzabad District, Kermanshah County, Kermanshah Province, Iran. At the 2006 census, its population was 72, in 12 families.

References 

Populated places in Kermanshah County